The Nelson Amendment is the name given to an amendment to restrict federal funding of elective abortions in the Senate version of America's Affordable Health Choices Act of 2009.

No abortions funded with government money
Democratic Senator Ben Nelson had said he would not support a bill that "doesn't make it clear that it does not fund abortion with government money".

Support for a filibuster
He introduced a Senate version of the Stupak–Pitts Amendment and threatened to support a filibuster of the Senate bill if the language was not included.

Segregation of elective abortion funding
He later agreed to accept a version that would allow people to use federal subsidies to buy plans that include abortion coverage while requiring them to pay for elective abortion coverage separately without subsidies. States could exclude plans providing abortion coverage from their respective exchanges. After criticism from national anti-abortion organizations, Nelson shifted his position and indicated that he would lobby for tighter restrictions on elective abortion funding similar to the Stupak-Pitts Amendment.

Relationship with Scott Brown's election
Until Scott Brown's election to the Senate in January 2010, the Nelson Amendment was viewed by the pro-choice leadership of the Democratic party as one of the big hurdles in passing legislation, along with other significant issues such as the public option.

References

Abortion in the United States
Healthcare reform legislation in the United States